Greens Estate was a plantation in Saint George, Barbados. It was owned by Edward Thomas, who claimed £2,295 7s 5d from the British Government in "compensation" following the emancipation of 108 enslaved Africans.

By the late nineteenth century the estate was owned by Archibald Pile.

References

Saint George, Barbados